Manini (Odia: ମାନିନୀ ) is a 1985 Indian Odia film, directed by Ravi Kinagi and produced by Bala Krushna Nayak. The film stars Sriram Panda, Debu Bose, Talluri Rameshwari, Aarathi and Asit Pati in lead roles. The film had musical score by Radha Krushna Bhanja. The film is known for the hit song "Mu Paradesi Chadhei" (Odia:ମୁଁ ପରଦେଶୀ ଚଢ଼େଇ), sung by Mohammed Aziz and the female version of the song by Kavita Krishnamurthy and Anuradha Paudwal.

Cast

Sriram Panda as Rajesh Mahapatra
Rameshwari as Manini Das
Debu Bose as Ram Narayan Das
Jairam Samal as Parama
Aarathi

References

External links
 

1979 films
1970s Odia-language films